The first season of The Masked Singer Malaysia aired on Astro Warna (CH127) and Warna HD (CH107) at 21:00 (MTC) every Friday with a total of eight episodes from 18 September until 6 November 2020.

Host and panelist

The program presented and hosted by the nation's well known entertainer, Dato' AC Mizal. The panelist consisting of nine popular local celebrities who played role as permanent jury.

Permanent jury members

Guest jury

Contestants and Elimination

Episodes

Week 1 (18 September 2020)

Week 2 (25 September 2020)

Week 3 (2 October 2020)

Week 4 (9 October 2020)

Week 5 (16 October 2020)

Week 6 (23 October 2020)

Week 7 (30 October 2020)

Week 8 (6 November 2020)

See also
The Masked Singer Malaysia
The Masked Singer Malaysia (season 2)
Masked Singer
Astro Warna
Akademi Fantasia
I Can See Your Voice Malaysia

References

External links
Astro's Official Website
Gempak's Official Website

Masked Singer Malaysia, The
Musical game shows
Malaysian reality television series
Malaysian television series based on South Korean television series
2020s Malaysian television series